Eddie Dempsey may refer to:

 Eddie Dempsey (jockey), Irish jockey, born 1911
 Eddie Dempsey (trade unionist), English trade unionist, born c. 1982